Karoline Mamelund (born 24 July 1987) is a former Norwegian handball player. She played for the club Stabæk Håndball.

She made her debut on the Norwegian national team in March 2011, and won silver with Norway at the 2012 European Women's Handball Championship.

She is married to Erlend Mamelund.

References

External links

Norwegian female handball players
1987 births
Living people